Kwadwo Mama Adams was a Ghanaian politician and a member of the Second Parliament of the Fourth Republic representing the Techiman South Constituency in the Brong Ahafo region of Ghana.

Early life 
Adams was born in Techiman South in the Brong Ahafo Region of Ghana.

Politics 
Adams was first elected into Parliament on the ticket of the National Democratic Congress during the December 1996 Ghanaian general election for the Techiman South Constituency. He polled 24,164 votes out of the 39,698 valid votes cast representing 46.30% over Jarvis Reginald Agyeman-Badu of the New Patriotic Party who polled 15,534 votes representing 29.80%.

Career 
Aside being a former member of Parliament for the Techiman South Constituency. He was a Deputy Minister for Brong Ahafo Region.

Death 
Adams was killed in a motor accident when the vehicle he was driving from Accra to Sunyani was involved in an accident with a tipper truck near Suhum. His body was taken to the Korle-Bu Teaching Hospital for autopsy. He died on 7 September 2002.

References 

2002 deaths
People from Bono East Region
National Democratic Congress (Ghana) politicians
Government ministers of Ghana
Ghanaian MPs 1997–2001
Ghanaian MPs 1993–1997